Le Funk is the second EP by the Louisville-based band VHS or Beta. Originally released in 2002 by ON! Records, it was reissued in 2005 by Astralwerks with three bonus remixes.

Reception

Track listing
Adapted from the liner notes of the physical albums.

Personnel
Personnel adapted from the CD booklets of the physical albums. All lyrics and vocals by VHS or Beta except where noted.

Mike Blaine – Production, engineering, mastering
Stacy Blakeman – Vocals 
Zeke Buck – Guitar
Kaiza Cumbler – Vocals 
Hazen Frick – Timbales 
Mark Guidry – Drums
Maiza Hixson – Vocals 
Matt Johnson – Conga, djembe 
Joshua – Production 

Emily Lazar – Remastering
Jessica Linker – Vocals 
Bob Mould – Production 
Mark Palgy – Bass guitar
Craig Pfunder – Guitar
Kevin Ratterman – Production, engineering
Sarah Register – Remastering assistant
Aaron Todovich – Saxophone

References 

2002 EPs
VHS or Beta albums
Albums produced by Bob Mould